Lipót Kállai (27 December 1912 – 15 November 1989) was a Hungarian footballer. He competed in the men's tournament at the 1936 Summer Olympics.

References

External links
 

1912 births
1989 deaths
Hungarian footballers
Hungary international footballers
Olympic footballers of Hungary
Footballers at the 1936 Summer Olympics
Footballers from Budapest
Association football forwards
Újpest FC players